Thalera fimbrialis, the Sussex emerald,  is a species of moth of the family Geometridae. It is found in Europe and across the Palearctic up to the area surrounding the Amur River.

It is rare in the UK, only breeding in the Dungeness area in Kent and one site in Rye, East Sussex.

The wingspan is 25–30 mm. The ground colour is green which can fade with increasing lifespan and then assumes yellowish tints. The outer edge of the wings is yellowish, the hair fringes along the edge are alternately white and reddish-brown. The forewing has two white crosslines, the hind wing only a single line as a continuation of the forewing outer line. The hind wing shows a slightly forward corner in the middle, over which there is an indentation. The larva is long and thin, green with a brownish-red dorsal stripe that is sometimes broken up into a variety of spots. The head is divided in two by a deep cleft  in the middle. On the front body segment there are a pair of spikes protruding above the head.

The moth flies from June to August depending on the location.

The larvae feed on various woody and herbaceous plants such as Erica, Calluna and Potentilla in mainland Europe.

In the UK, this species only inhabits vegetated shingle and primarily feeds on Wild Carrot, Daucus carota with late larval instars occasionally found on plants in the Ragwort Senecio genus.

References

External links

Sussex emerald at UKmoths
Fauna Europaea
Lepiforum.de
Vlindernet.nl 

Hemitheini
Moths described in 1763
Moths of Europe
Moths of Asia
Taxa named by Giovanni Antonio Scopoli